Waldo Stadium is a stadium in Kalamazoo, Michigan.  It is primarily used for football, and has been the home of Western Michigan University Broncos football in rudimentary form since 1914, and as a complete stadium since 1939. It currently has a capacity of 30,200 spectators.

History
The stadium was built at a cost of $250,000 ($4.3 million in 2016), and it opened in 1939 with a 6–0 win over Miami University.  The cost for Waldo Stadium also included the construction of Hyames Field, the school's baseball stadium directly west of the football field. The stadium is named for Dwight B. Waldo, first president of the school.

The location of Waldo Stadium has been home for Western football since 1914.  A field, without a stadium or modern seating, existed through 1938, until the construction and completion of the stadium in 1939.  It originally included an eight-lane track, which has since moved to Kanley Track across Stadium Drive. Financing came through private donations, and those who donated were awarded tickets to the inaugural game against Western Kentucky University.  Over the years, WMU continued adding seating to the stadium. In 1973 the capacity was increased to 25,000, and AstroTurf replaced the natural grass field. A renovation in 1989 pushed the available seats to 30,200.  In 1993 permanent lighting was added, and in 1995 the University added 325 club seats to the press box. In 1998 the Bill Brown Alumni Football Center was completed, which created new offices for staff, suites, and upgraded facilities for the team.

In 2013, the athletic department made almost $3.5 million in renovations and upgrades to Waldo Stadium and Seelye Center, the football team's indoor practice facility. Included in the upgrades were: new artificial turf for stadium, new brown and gold turf for the indoor practice facility, a revamped and upgraded weight room, a remodeled locker room, renovated meeting rooms, and a new team lounge and showplace. Additional renovations were made to the stadium complex from 2014 to 2015 including new speakers for the stadium, new scoreboards and video boards bringing renovation costs to $5.7 million since 2013. A $2 million donation for the project was made by 1988 WMU alum Alec Gores.

On October 14, 2017, the Bronco football team was slated to play Akron for homecoming, when rains from a fall storm combined with drainage system failures flooded the field and postponed the game. Also contributing to the flood, Waldo Stadium is considered the lowest point in the city of Kalamazoo. The game was played at 1pm the next day (A possible Sunday first for Waldo Stadium), and the Broncos were defeated by Akron 13-14. It was reported that over 1 million gallons of water were pumped off the field overnight to prepare the field for the Sunday game.

Seelye Center
In 2003, the stadium took on a new look with the completion of the $25 million Donald J. Seelye Center, built by a local construction company, Kalleward Group.  The Seelye Center rises eight stories and houses an indoor practice field, weight and fitness rooms, and staff offices.  It is located on the edge of the northeast endzone, allowing the Seelye club suites to get a view of the game.  The Seelye Center incorporated the existing Oakland Gymnasium into the structure, allowing for a very modern entrance on one side, and a retro style on the other.

Notable visiting opponents
The following is a list of notable programs to play WMU at Waldo Stadium.

* Future scheduled opponents

Home field records
WMU Bronco Football Waldo Stadium Records Since 2000

High school football
In 1975, Waldo Stadium was one of the hosts for the inaugural MHSAA Football State Championship in Class A and Class D.  Livonia Franklin beat Traverse City (now Traverse City Central) 21-7 in the Class A title game while Crystal Falls Forest Park defeated Flint Holy Rosary 50-0 in the Class D title game.  The finals for all classes were moved to the newly constructed Pontiac Silverdome beginning with the 1976 title games.
 
In May 2010, the Kalamazoo Valley Association (a local high school athletic conference) announced that it would be playing an inaugural Kalamazoo Valley Association Football Classic at the stadium.

See also
 List of NCAA Division I FBS football stadiums

References

External links 
 Waldo Stadium - WMUBroncos.com - Official Website of WMU Athletics
 Donald Seelye Athletic Center - WMUBroncos.com - Official Website of WMU Athletics

College football venues
Western Michigan Broncos football
Sports venues in Michigan
Buildings and structures in Kalamazoo, Michigan
Sports in Kalamazoo, Michigan
Event venues established in 1939
1939 establishments in Michigan
American football venues in Michigan